Teenage Mother (also known as The Hygiene Story) is a 1967 American exploitation film directed by Jerry Gross and starring Arlene Sue Farber. It is about teenage pregnancy, hygiene and a graphic actualization of birth. It was billed as "The film that dares to explain what most parents can't." It marked Fred Willard's film debut.

Reception
An author likened the film to a grindhouse edition of the 2007 film Juno.

In a brief interview on the DVD extras of the 2007 documentary film Heckler, Willard reported the audience at one screening of the film booed after his character interrupted an attempted sexual assault.

See also
 List of American films of 1967
 I Drink Your Blood
 Cinemation Industries

External links

References

1960s exploitation films
Films about educators
Teenage pregnancy in film
1967 films
1960s teen drama films
1967 drama films
1960s English-language films
American exploitation films
American teen drama films
1960s American films